HMNZS Puriri (T02) was a coastal cargo boat which was requisitioned by the Royal New Zealand Navy (RNZN) and converted into a minesweeper. She was sunk by a German mine 25 days after she was commissioned.

Operational history
Puriri was owned by the Anchor Shipping and Foundry Company. Puriri was taken over on 20 November 1940 and handed to the dockyard for conversion.

She returned to port three days later and resumed conversion.

She was commissioned on 19 April 1941, and assigned to the 25th Minesweeping Flotilla, which was assigned to sweep German mines in the Hauraki Gulf.

Fate
On 13 May 1941, the launch Rawea attached a buoy to a German mine that had been caught in a fishing net eight miles north-east of Bream Head. Puriri and HMNZS Gale were sent to deactivate it, and arrived in the area the next day. Gale sailed past the mine without seeing it, but Puriri, also not seeing the mine, struck it at 11 am.

Of the 31 aboard, five were killed or drowned, and three seamen were injured, one seriously. Gale rescued the 26 survivors.

The cargo boat  was requisitioned as a replacement for Puriri.

See also
Minesweepers of the Royal New Zealand Navy

References

 McDougall, R J  (1989) New Zealand Naval Vessels. Page 69–78. Government Printing Office. 
 Tonson, A.E. HMS Puriri 1938, NZ Navy, article in Naval Historical Review, March 1983

Further reading
 Harker, Jack (2000)The Rockies: New Zealand Minesweepers at War. Silver Owl Press.

External links
 HMNZS Puriri

Minesweepers of the Royal New Zealand Navy
Ships sunk by mines
Ships built in Leith
World War II shipwrecks in the Pacific Ocean
Shipwrecks of the Northland Region
1933 ships
Maritime incidents in May 1941
1941 in New Zealand